The International Federation of Film Archives (FIAF) was founded in Paris in 1938 by the Cinémathèque Française, the Reichsfilmarchiv in Berlin, the British Film Institute and the Museum of Modern Art in New York City.

FIAF brings together the world's leading institutions in the field of moving picture heritage.
Its affiliates describe themselves as "the defenders of the twentieth century's own art form". They are dedicated to the rescue, collection, preservation and screening of moving images, which are valued both as works of art and culture and as historical documents. As of April 2021, it comprises 171 institutions in 79 countries - a reflection of the extent to which preservation of moving image heritage has become a world-wide concern.

Aims 
 to uphold a code of ethics for film preservation and practical standards for all areas of film archive work
 to promote the creation of moving image archives in countries which lack them
 to seek the improvement of the legal context within which film archives carry out their work
 to promote film culture and facilitate historical research on both a national and international level
 to foster training and expertise in preservation and other archive techniques
 to ensure the permanent availability of material from the collections for study and research by the wider community
 to encourage the collection and preservation of documents and materials relating to the cinema
 to develop cooperation between members and "to ensure the international availability of films and documents".

Affiliates 
FIAF's members are archives that are actively engaged in the activities and fully committed to the ideals described earlier. Current members reflect a wide range of non-profit institutions, including government archives, independent foundations and trusts, self-contained cinematheques, and museum or university departments.

FIAF's Associates are non-profit institutions that support the goals of the Federation but are not involved in film preservation per se. In this way, FIAF is joined by moving image museums, videotheques, documentation centres, and so on.

Activities 

Much of the work of FIAF takes the form of active cooperation between members on projects of mutual benefit or interest - for example, the careful restoration of a particular film, or the compilation of a national or international filmography. The more visible activities include the annual congress, publications and the work of the specialist commissions.

The Annual Congress
FIAF meets every year in a different country. The Congress combines a General Assembly at which the formal business of the Federation is transacted with a programme of symposia and workshops on technical or legal aspects of film archive work and on aspects of film history and culture. The final congress of Fiaf was held in Budapest on 24-29 April 2022.

The Specialized Commissions
The Commissions are groups of individual experts from affiliated archives who meet regularly to pursue work programmes that promote and assist in the development and maintenance of standards at both the theoretical and the practical level. The three FIAF Commissions are the Cataloguing and Documentation Commission, the Technical Commission, and the Programming and Access to Collections Commission.

Publications 
FIAF publishes the Journal of Film Preservation twice a year. A special office compiles and publishes the International Index to Film Periodicals and the FIAF International FilmArchive Database. Publications also include an annual bibliography of members' publications, the proceedings of symposia or workshops, the results of surveys and reports, manuals and discussion papers prepared by the specialist Commissions and the results of other FIAF projects.
 Journal of Film Preservation
 International Index to Film Periodicals
 FIAF Databases
 FIAF Bulletin Online

Relations with international organisations 
FIAF has always had an active international profile. It was closely involved in the preparatory work for the UNESCO Recommendation for the Safeguarding and Preservation of Moving Images, approved in Belgrade in 1980. In pursuit of the goals of the Recommendation, the Federation facilitates contacts between developing archives and older archives to make sure that experience is passed on. The Federation is a member of the Coordinating Council of Audiovisual Archives Associations (CCAAA).

Education 
Training of archive personnel takes place at FIAF Summer Schools and Technical Symposia that have been held several times in various countries. Their aim is to introduce participants to the necessary skills of preservation, cataloguing, documentation and even administration.

FIAF Award 

The FIAF Award celebrates a personality – external to the FIAF archival community – whose experience in the field of cinema underlines the objectives and goals of the Federation.

The FIAF Award was created in 2001, and has since then been presented to the following personalities:
 Martin Scorsese (2001)
 Manoel de Oliveira (2002)
 Ingmar Bergman (2003)
 Geraldine Chaplin (2004)
 Mike Leigh (2005)
 Hou Hsiao-hsien (2006)
 Peter Bogdanovich (2007)
 Nelson Pereira dos Santos (2008)
 Rithy Panh (2009)
 Liv Ullmann (2010)
 Kyōko Kagawa (2011)
 Agnès Varda (2013)
 Jan Švankmajer (2014)
 Yervant Gianikian and Angela Ricci Lucchi (2015)
 Jean-Pierre Dardenne and Luc Dardenne (2016)
 Christopher Nolan (2017)
 Apichatpong Weerasethakul (2018)
 Jean-Luc Godard (2019)
 Walter Salles (2020)
 Amitabh Bachchan (2021)
 Tilda Swinton (2022)

See also 
 Cinematheque
 List of film archives
 Association of European Film Archives and Cinematheques
 Coordinating Council of Audiovisual Archives Association

Further reading 

FIAF Timeline

References

External links
 
 International Index to Film Periodicals
 FIAF Congresses website

Film organizations in France
Organizations based in Paris
Organizations established in 1938
Film preservation
FIAF-affiliated institutions